The Women's 400 metres hurdles at the 2010 Commonwealth Games as part of the athletics programme was held at the Jawaharlal Nehru Stadium on Saturday 9 October and Sunday 10 October 2010.

Records

Round 1
First 3 in each heat (Q) and 2 best performers (q) advance to the Final.

Heat 1

Heat 2

Final

External links
2010 Commonwealth Games - Athletics

Women's 400 metres hurdles
2010
2010 in women's athletics